The following is a list of ecoregions in Cameroon, according to the Worldwide Fund for Nature (WWF).

Terrestrial ecoregions
by major habitat type

Tropical and subtropical moist broadleaf forests

 Atlantic Equatorial coastal forests
 Cameroonian Highlands forests
 Cross–Sanaga–Bioko coastal forests
 Mount Cameroon and Bioko montane forests
 Northwestern Congolian lowland forests

Tropical and subtropical dry broadleaf forests

Tropical and subtropical grasslands, savannas, and shrublands

 East Sudanian savanna
 Guinean forest–savanna mosaic
 Mandara Plateau mosaic
 Northern Congolian forest–savanna mosaic
 Sahelian Acacia savanna

Flooded grasslands and savannas

 Lake Chad flooded savanna

Mangroves

 Central African mangroves

Freshwater ecoregions
by bioregion

Nilo-Sudan

 Lake Chad Catchment

West Coastal Equatorial

 Central West Coastal Equatorial
 Northern West Coastal Equatorial
 Western Equatorial Crater Lakes

Congo

 Sangha

Marine ecoregions
 Gulf of Guinea Central

References
 Burgess, Neil, Jennifer D’Amico Hales, Emma Underwood (2004). Terrestrial Ecoregions of Africa and Madagascar: A Conservation Assessment. Island Press, Washington DC.
 Spalding, Mark D., Helen E. Fox, Gerald R. Allen, Nick Davidson et al. "Marine Ecoregions of the World: A Bioregionalization of Coastal and Shelf Areas". Bioscience Vol. 57 No. 7, July/August 2007, pp. 573–583.
 Thieme, Michelle L. (2005). Freshwater Ecoregions of Africa and Madagascar: A Conservation Assessment. Island Press, Washington DC.

 
Ecoregions
Cameroon